The 2016 Texas Christian Horned Frogs football team represented Texas Christian University (TCU) in the 2016 NCAA Division I FBS football season. The 121st TCU football team played as a member of the Big 12 Conference (Big 12) and played their home games at Amon G. Carter Stadium, on the TCU campus in Fort Worth, Texas.  The Horned Frogs were led by 16th-year head coach Gary Patterson, the winningest coach in TCU football history. They finished the season 6–7, 4–5 in Big 12 play to finish in fifth place. They were invited to the Liberty Bowl where they lost to Georgia.

Previous season
The 2015 TCU Horned Frogs football team finished the 2015 season ranked #7 nationally with an 11–2 (7–2 Big 12) record, second in the Big 12 standings (tied with Oklahoma State and behind Big 12 Champion Oklahoma), and as the 2016 Alamo Bowl Champions.  Despite a plague of injuries on offense and defense, with over 23 starters missing significant playing time due to injury and 30 freshmen seeing meaningful playing time, head coach Gary Patterson led the Horned Frogs to a 10+ win season for the 10th time and a bowl game for the 13th time in his 15-year stint as the TCU head coach. The Horned Frogs concluded their season with an improbable comeback victory at the 2016 Alamo Bowl against #15 Oregon; after trailing 31–0 at halftime, senior backup quarterback Bram Kohlhausen led the Frogs to roar back for a 47–41 (3OT) victory over the Ducks.

Preseason

Departures
Senior quarterback and 2014 Big 12 Offensive Player of the Year and 2015 runner-up Trevone Boykin and unanimous first team All-American wide receiver Josh Doctson led a large class of graduating seniors that departed TCU at the conclusion of the 2015 season.

Recruiting class
TCU inked five junior college transfers in December 2015, including 4-star defensive end Mat Boesen (Long Beach C.C.), 4-star linebacker Tyree Horton, 4-star safety Markell Simmons (Pima C.C.), 4-star wide receiver Taj Williams (Iowa Western C.C.), and 3-star offensive tackle Chris Gaynor (Dodge City C.C.). Four of the five junior college transfers enrolled at TCU in January 2016, will participate in spring practice and will be eligible to play in 2016. The fifth signee, Tyree Horton, is expected to enroll in the summer. TCU added a sixth junior college transfer, 4-star wide receiver Ryan Parker (Tyler J.C.), on February 3, 2016; Parker is expected to enroll in the summer.

Four of TCU's freshmen signees arrived early for the spring term at TCU and enrolled with the four January junior college transfers. The January freshmen enrollees include 4-star wide receiver Isaiah Graham (Bastrop, LA), 4-star athlete (running back and linebacker) Sewo Olonilua (Humble Kingwood), 3-star tight end Artayvious Lynn (Milford Academy), and 3-star quarterback Brennen Wooten (San Angelo Central).

The Frogs added a late signee in July. In the wake of the Baylor sexual assault scandal and firing of Art Briles, Baylor released 4-star defensive end Brandon Bowen from his National Letter of Intent, and Bowen signed with the TCU.

TCU signed the following 23 recruits, which combined to be a unanimous top-25 class, ranked as high as 13:

Incoming transfers
In addition to the 2016 recruiting class, TCU added six transfers, including three eligible for the current season, to the 2016 roster:

Coaching staff
Co-defensive coordinator and linebackers coach DeMontie Cross left TCU after the 2016 Alamo Bowl to accept the sole defensive coordinator position at Missouri, where Cross played from 1994–96. Despite anticipated turnover on the TCU coaching staff as a result of the Horned Frogs' successes, particularly their offensive turnaround in 2014 and 2015, Cross was the only position or coordinator-level coach to depart Fort Worth. Former TCU and NFL defensive lineman Zarnell Fitch was promoted to defensive line Coach after serving as the Frogs' director of high school relations from June 2014 through January 2016, and former TCU and NFL linebacker Jason Phillips will continue his work at TCU as a graduate assistant and coach linebackers. The 2016 staff was completed with the promotion of graduate assistant Jake Brown as the new director of high school relations and recruiting.

In November 2015, TCU co-offensive coordinator/play-caller and inside wide receivers coach Doug Meacham was named a finalist for the head coaching job at the University of North Texas, and the Fort Worth Star-Telegram reported Meacham was expected to receive and accept an offer; but on December 1, Meacham withdrew his name from consideration for the post. Meacham was also rumored to be named the new head coach at Tulane in December 2015, but the rumors were quashed by Meaham and TCU and Meacham was not named as the Green Wave's new coach. In January 2016, Meacham declined an offer to become the head coach of the Texas State Bobcats and an offer to become the sole offensive coordinator at Texas A&M.

In December 2015, TCU co-offensive coordinator and quarterbacks coach Sonny Cumbie was reportedly offered a three-year, $1+ million per year contract to become the sole offensive coordinator and play caller at the University of Texas.  Despite an intense public effort by Longhorns' head coach Charlie Strong, Cumbie declined the offer and elected to remain in his role at TCU.

Frogs' running backs coach Curtis Luper was reportedly a finalist for the head coaching job at ULM, but he withdrew his name from consideration on the same day Sonny Cumbie declined the offensive coordinator position at Texas and Doug Meacham quashed rumors regarding the head coaching job at Tulane. Luper was also a candidate for the head coaching job at UTSA and interviewed for the job on January 10 before eventually removing his name from consideration.

In January 2016, offensive graduate assistant Bryson Oliver left TCU to accept a full-time coaching job at Tarleton State, and former Oklahoma State quarterback J. W. Walsh joined the Horned Frogs as a new offensive graduate assistant.

Spring practice
The 2016 Horned Frogs opened spring practice on February 27, 2016. Over the course of the 15 practices in 5 weeks, Patterson praised the efforts of all junior college transfer early enrollees and addressed concerns at defensive tackle and noted development at linebacker with players' return from or experience gained as a result of others' injury. Entering spring question, the Frogs' biggest question mark was at starting quarterback. After the spring game on April 1, highlighted by the play of defensive ends and cornerbacks, starting quarterback contenders Kenny Hill and Foster Sawyer both remained listed as possible starters on the post-spring depth chart.

Fall camp
Big 12 media days were held in Dallas, Texas, on July 18 and 19. Prior to media days, Kenny Hill was named Big 12 Preseason Newcomer of the Year and Josh Carraway, James McFarland and KaVontae Turpin were named to the Preseason All-Big 12 football team.  The Frogs were also picked by the Big 12 media to finish second in the conference standings and received 2 first place votes, with the remainder going to top-picked OU.

Players reported for fall camp on August 3, and the first practice was held August 4. Head coach Gary Patterson named redshirt sophomore Kenny Hill the starting quarterback on August 25, 2016.

Schedule

All times Central

Rankings

Personnel

Roster

Injury report

Depth chart
TBA

Game summaries

South Dakota State

The 2016 Horned Frogs opened their season at home versus Division I–FCS opponent South Dakota State.  The Jackrabbits play in the Missouri Valley Football Conference and finished the 2015 season with an 8–4 (5–3 MVFC) record.  Ranked #10 in the final regular season FCS poll, the Jackrabbits were upset by the #16 Montana Grizzlies in the first round of the 2015 NCAA FCS  Playoffs. The Jackrabbits were ranked as high as #8 in the 2016 preseason FCS polls.

Arkansas

The Razorbacks' trip to Fort Worth marked the first time the two former Southwest Conference rivals have met on the gridiron since Arkansas departed the SWC for the SEC in 1992, and the first matchup pitting TCU head coach Gary Patterson against Arkansas coach Bret Bielema since the two faced off in the 2011 Rose Bowl Game when Bielema coached the Wisconsin Badgers. The Horned Frogs' double overtime defeat snapped their 14-game home winning streak; their last loss at home came on November 30, 2013 to #9 Baylor.

Iowa State

The Horned Frogs and Cyclones conference opener in Fort Worth marked new Cyclones head coach Matt Campbell's debut in Big 12 Conference play.

SMU

The Horned Frogs returned to and closed non-conference play in the 96th Battle for the Iron Skillet.  The game against the Mustangs was the Frogs' first road game of 2016 and the second of five games against former Southwest Conference foes in 2016.

Oklahoma

The winner of the 2014 and 2015 TCU–Oklahoma matchups went on to win at least a share of the years' Big 12 Conference Championships.  In 2014, a late pick-six helped TCU secure a victory, and the Frogs went on to split the 2014 Big 12 title with Baylor.  In 2015, Oklahoma deflected a go-ahead TCU two-point conversion attempt in the final seconds of the game in Norman, and the Sooners went on to win the Big 12 title and represent the conference in the College Football Playoff.

Kansas

The Horned Frogs left the Fort Worth–Dallas metroplex for the first time in the 2016 season to face Big 12 foe Kansas.  The Frogs were 4–0 versus the Jayhawks in Big 12 Conference play, but despite being a heavy favorite in each matchup, they had only won the four meetings by a combined 34 points.  TCU, ranked in the top 15 during the 2014 and 2015 games, narrowly escaped the Jayhawks with less than one-score win margins.

West Virginia

Texas Tech

Baylor

Oklahoma State

Texas

Since TCU joined the Big 12 in 2012, every TCU–Texas game in Austin had been held on Thanksgiving weekend. The first two contests were held on Thanksgiving night, with the Horned Frogs winning both. The Longhorns failed to cut into TCU's 3–1 Big 12 record over the Longhorns on Black Friday afternoon in Austin.

Kansas State

Georgia–Liberty Bowl

Honors and awards

Preseason awards

Award watch lists

Weekly awards

References

TCU
TCU Horned Frogs football seasons
TCU Horned Frogs football